The Eneopterinae are a subfamily of crickets, in the family Gryllidae, based on the type genus Eneoptera.  It is one of several groups widely described as "true crickets". Of the more than 500 species that make up this subfamily, most occur in moist, tropical habitats. These insects are medium to large and brown or gray in color. They eat plant leaves, flowers, and fruits and can occasionally cause economic damage.  Their eggs are deposited in pith, bark, or wood. Eneopterinae show a great diversity in stridulatory apparatus, signals emitted, and associated behaviour.

Tribes and Genera
Eneopterinae currently consists of six tribes and the Orthoptera Species File lists:

Eneopterini
Auth. Saussure, 1874 (South America)
 Eneoptera Burmeister, 1838

Eurepini

Auth. Otte & Alexander, 1983 (Indo-China - Australia)
 genus group Eurepa Otte & Alexander, 1983
 Eurepa Walker, 1869
 Myara Otte & Alexander, 1983
 genus group Eurepella Otte & Alexander, 1983
 Arilpa Otte & Alexander, 1983
 Eurepella Otte & Alexander, 1983
 Salmanites Chopard, 1951 (synonym Napieria Baehr, 1989)

Hemigryllini
Auth. Gorochov, 1986 (South America)
 Hemigryllus Saussure, 1877

Lebinthini

Auth. Robillard, 2004 (SE Asia, Australia, Pacific, S. America)
 Agnotecous Saussure, 1878
 Cardiodactylus Saussure, 1878
 Centuriarus Robillard, 2011
 Gnominthus Robillard & Vicente, 2015
 Julverninthus Robillard & Su, 2018
 Lebinthus Stål, 1877
 Ligypterus Saussure, 1878
 Macrobinthus Robillard & Dong, 2016
 Microbinthus Robillard & Dong, 2016
 Pixibinthus Robillard & Anso, 2016
 Ponca (insect) Hebard, 1928
 Swezwilderia Chopard, 1929

Nisitrini
Auth. Robillard, 2004 (Malesia, PNG)

 Nisitrus Saussure, 1878
 Paranisitra Chopard, 1925

Xenogryllini
Auth. Robillard, 2004 (Central-southern Africa, Asia)
 Pseudolebinthus Robillard, 2006
 Xenogryllus Bolívar, 1890

incertae sedis
 Adenophallusia – monotypic – A. naiguatana de Mello & de Camargo e Mello, 1996
 †Brontogryllus – monotypic – B. excelsus Martins-Neto, 1991
 Jabulania – monotypic – J. clancularia Otte & Perez-Gelabert, 2009
 †Proecanthus – monotypic – P. anatolicus Sharov, 1968

References

External links
 
 

Crickets
Orthoptera subfamilies